Fort Supply is a town in Woodward County, Oklahoma, United States,  northwest of the city of Woodward, the county seat. The population was 330 at the 2010 census.

History
The United States Army post of Fort Supply was established in 1868 as a "Camp of Supply" for the winter campaign that General Philip Sheridan led against the Southern Plains Indians.

People established the town of Fitzgerald three miles west-southwest of the site of the former Fort Supply in 1902, but this town quickly failed.

Rancher H. H. Halsell sold the land one mile west of Fort Supply to territorial legislator James P. Gandy.  Gandy hired surveyors to plat the land for a town site and founded the town of Supply in 1903.  He moved most of the original buildings of Supply from the recently failed town of Fitzgerald.  The Government established the first post office for the town of Supply on 12 May 1903.  In the early years, area farmers and ranchers centered their economic trade around the town.

In 1908, the State of Oklahoma transformed Fort Supply, the derelict army post, into Western Oklahoma State Hospital, also known as Western State Hospital or Fort Supply State Hospital, the first state-operated mental institution of Oklahoma.

The Flood Control Act of 1936 provided for construction of a dam and reservoir one mile southeast of the town in the valley of Wolf Creek.  Work began on the largest earthen dam in the United States of America in October 1938 and Fort Supply Lake was completed in May 1942.  The United States Army Corps of Engineers administers Fort Supply Lake and the adjacent wildlife and recreation area.

On 1 May 1943, the people changed the name of the post office and town of Supply to Fort Supply.

On 6 December 1988, the State of Oklahoma located a new prison, William S. Key Correctional Center, on the grounds of nearby former Fort Supply.  Western State Psychiatric Center also has operations on the grounds.  Agriculture and employment at these state institutions form the economic base of the community of Fort Supply.

Geography
Fort Supply is located at  (36.572271, -99.573856). 

Fort Supply Reservoir is directly south; the Hal & Fern Cooper Wildlife Management Area, covering 16,080 acres and administered by the Oklahoma Department of Wildlife Conservation, is to the east.

Climate

Demographics

As of the census of 2000, there were 328 people, 136 households, and 98 families residing in the town. There were 171 housing units at an average density of 760.3 per square mile (300.1/km2). The racial makeup of the town was 95.73% White, 0.30% African American, 1.83% Native American, 0.61% from other races, and 1.52% from two or more races. Hispanic or Latino of any race were 0.91% of the population.

There were 136 households, out of which 25.7% had children under the age of 18 living with them, 61.8% were married couples living together, 7.4% had a female householder with no husband present, and 27.9% were non-families. 27.2% of all households were made up of individuals, and 14.0% had someone living alone who was 65 years of age or older. The average household size was 2.41 and the average family size was 2.91.

In the town, the population was spread out, with 24.4% under the age of 18, 7.0% from 18 to 24, 23.5% from 25 to 44, 27.4% from 45 to 64, and 17.7% who were 65 years of age or older. The median age was 41 years. For every 100 females, there were 86.4 males. For every 100 females age 18 and over, there were 86.5 males.

The median income for a household in the town was $30,893, and the median income for a family was $37,500. Males had a median income of $28,333 versus $20,833 for females. The per capita income for the town was $15,836. About 5.8% of families and 6.8% of the population were below the poverty line, including 13.4% of those under age 18 and none of those age 65 or over.

Historic sites
The nearby Cooper Bison Kill Site is on the National Register of Historic Places listings in Harper County, Oklahoma.

The Fort Supply Historic District is on the National Register of Historic Places listings in Woodward County, Oklahoma.

References

External links
 Encyclopedia of Oklahoma History and Culture - Fort Supply (town)

Towns in Oklahoma
Towns in Woodward County, Oklahoma